CJ Stone may refer to:

C.J. Stone (writer)
Bass Bumpers,  DJ and record production team, known for their dance/techno music.